"The Cold Equations" is a science fiction short story by American writer Tom Godwin, first published in Astounding Magazine in August 1954. In 1970, the Science Fiction Writers of America selected it as one of the best science-fiction short stories published before 1965, and it was therefore included in The Science Fiction Hall of Fame, Volume One, 1929–1964. The story has been widely anthologized and dramatized.

Summary
The story takes place entirely aboard an Emergency Dispatch Ship headed for the frontier planet Woden with a load of desperately needed medical supplies. The pilot discovers a stowaway: an eighteen-year-old girl.

By law, all  stowaways are to be jettisoned because  vessels carry only the fuel absolutely necessary to land safely at their destination. The girl wanted merely to visit her brother on the remote planet and was unaware of the law.

The pilot explains that her weight sabotages the mission by exceeding the ship's fuel limit. The subsequent crash would kill both of them and then doom the colonists awaiting the medical supplies.

After contacting her brother in the last moments of her life, the girl willingly climbs into the airlock and is ejected into space.

Development
The story was shaped by the Astounding Science Fiction editor John W. Campbell, who sent "Cold Equations" back to Tom Godwin three times before he got the version he wanted because "Godwin kept coming up with ingenious ways to save the girl!"
Campbell's biographer A. Nevala-Lee noted in 2016 that the story was published at a time when Campbell had embraced contrianism on the basis that (in Campbell’s words) there was "no viewpoint that has zero validity – though some have very small validity, or very limited application."
Nevala-Lee also revealed that Campbell described the story as a
"gimmick on the proposition ‘human sacrifice is absolutely unacceptable’. So we deliberately, knowingly and painfully sacrifice a young, pretty girl... and make the reader accept that it is valid!"

Reception
Critic and engineer Gary Westfahl wrote that because the story's premise is based on systems that were built without adequate margin for error, the story is "good physics", but "lousy engineering", and that it frustrated him so much he decided it had been "not worth [his] time".

Writer Cory Doctorow has made a similar argument, but is less critical: He sees this as an example of a "moral hazard" genre. Doctorow notes that the constraints under which the characters operate are decided by the writers, and not "the inescapable laws of physics". He argues that the decision of the writer – to give the vessel no margin of safety and a critical supply of fuel – is justified by narrative's need to focus readers' attention onto the necessity of tough decisions at a time of crisis, rather than mulling over the responsibility for proper planning from the onset, that ensures safety.

Writer Don Sakers' short story "The Cold Solution" deconstructs the premise. In 1992 it was awarded "the readers' favorite" Analog short story of 1991.

R. Harter wrote a detailed analysis of the story in 1977, with special attention to the possible negligence of those who designed the situation in which dilemmas like this could occur, and how this paralleled similar concerns involving industrial safety legislation.

In a 2019 essay, Doctorow condemned Campbell for turning the story "into a parable about the foolishness of women and the role of men in guiding them to accept the cold, hard facts of life".

Similar concept in earlier stories
The Encyclopedia of Science Fiction points to A Plunge into Space (Robert Cromie, 1890) as having a subplot very similar to "The Cold Equations". "A Weighty Decision" (Al Feldstein in Weird Science, 1952) and the story "Precedent" (E. C. Tubb in New Worlds, 1952). also have been cited as potential inspirations. In all three, as in "The Cold Equations", a stowaway must be ejected from a spaceship because the fuel aboard is only sufficient for the planned mission mass.

David Drake stated "The plot is lifted directly from 'A Weighty Decision,' a story in the May–June, 1952, issue of the EC comic Weird Science. I don't believe that coincidence could have created plots so similar in detail" and ends with "The plot is such an obvious steal from the comic that I think Godwin would have concealed it better if he hadn't intended to use a completely different ending. I can also imagine that Godwin wouldn't have expressed his qualms at changing the ending to Campbell, who wouldn't have winked at direct plagiarism. (Not that EC had any legitimate gripe: Bill Gaines laughed in later years about the way he and his staff at EC stole plots from SF stories and ran them without credit.)"

Adaptations

Film and television
 An adaptation of it aired on the 1962 British anthology series Out of This World and starred Peter Wyngarde and Jane Asher.  The episode was lost soon after broadcast, but an audio-only recording has survived and is available on DVD.Out of This World (DVD)DVD details at Cinema Paradiso
 Another television adaptation aired as part of the  1985–1989 revival of The Twilight Zone.
Episode 8 of the anime Martian Successor Nadesico is named for and takes elements from the story.
 The story formed the basis for a made-for-TV movie starring Billy Campbell and Poppy Montgomery, which aired on the Sci-Fi Channel.
 It is the basis of the award-winning 2014 short film, "The Stowaway", which was released on YouTube.
 A similar premise is used for the 2021 film Stowaway.

Radio
 The story was also adapted into an episode of the radio program X Minus One in 1955. In a 1958 episode of Exploring Tomorrow in 1958, the stowaway is a woman trying to visit her husband to make amends for an affair.
 Another adaptation featured as a part of Faster Than Light on CBC Radio's Sunday Showcase in September 2002 by Joe Mahoney. The program was hosted by science fiction writer Robert J. Sawyer.

Web
The fiction podcast The Drabblecast released a full-cast reading of the story on July 15, 2013.

Awards
Tied for 9th place in Astounding/Analog magazine's 1971 All-Time Poll short fiction category.

Placed 8th in the 1999 Locus Awards for best novelette.

Publication history

Original publication:
 
 
The following anthologies have included "The Cold Equations":

Modern Science Fiction (Anchor Books, 1974) By Norman Spinrad.
The Road to Science Fiction #3: From Heinlein to Here (Signet, 1979) By James E. Gunn.
The Great SF Stories: 16 (1954) (DAW Books, 1987) By Isaac Asimov, Martin H. Greenberg.
The Ascent of Wonder: The Evolution of Hard SF (Tor Books, 1994) By David G. Hartwell and Kathryn Cramer.
The World Turned Upside Down (Baen Books, 2005) By David Drake, Eric Flint and Jim Baen.

See also

 Factor of safety
 The Science Fiction Hall of Fame, Volume One, 1929–1964, an anthology of the greatest science fiction short stories prior to 1965, as judged by the Science Fiction Writers of America
 Trolley problem
 Tunnel problem

References

External links
 
Text of the story, at Lightspeed

1954 short stories
Science fiction short stories
Works originally published in Analog Science Fiction and Fact
Fiction set in the 2170s